The Finnish national road 51 is the 2nd class main route between the major cities of Helsinki and Raseborg in southern Finland. It runs from Ruoholahti in Helsinki and passes through Espoo to Kirkkonummi as a motorway called Länsiväylä, where it continues to Karis in Raseborg as a smaller road.

Route 

The road passes through the following localities:
Helsinki (Ruoholahti and Lauttasaari)
Espoo (Keilaniemi, Matinkylä and Nöykkiö)
Kirkkonummi (Sarsvik, Jorvas, Kirkkonummi, and Vuohimäki)
Siuntio (Fågelvik)
Ingå (Degerby and Ingå)
Raseborg) (Svarvarböle and Karis)

References

External links

Roads in Finland
Transport in Helsinki
Transport in Espoo